The Defileul Mureșului Superior Natural Park is a protected area (natural park category V IUCN) situated in Romania, in Mureș County,

Location 
The Natural Park is located in the superior course of the river Mureș, in the administrative territory of Deda, Răstolița, Lunca Bradului and Stânceni communes, in the north-eastern part of Mureș county.

Description 
Defileul Mureșului Superior with an area of 9.156 ha was declared natural protected area by the Government Decision Number 1143 on September 18, 2007 (published in Romanian Official Paper Number 691 on October 11, 2007) and represent an area the very tight portions,  with volcanic blocks, with high and steep slopes, with flora and fauna specific Eastern Carpathians

See also 
 Protected areas of Romania

References 

Protected areas of Romania
Geography of Mureș County
Protected areas established in 2007
Tourist attractions in Mureș County